The 1907 VFL season was the eleventh season of the Victorian Football League (VFL), the highest level senior Australian rules football competition in Victoria. The season featured eight clubs, ran from 27 April until 21 September, and comprised a 17-game home-and-away season followed by a finals series featuring the top four clubs.

The premiership was won by the Carlton Football Club for the second time and second time consecutively, after it defeated  by five points in the 1907 VFL Grand Final.

Premiership season
In 1907, the VFL competition consisted of eight teams of 18 on-the-field players each, with no "reserves", although any of the 18 players who had left the playing field for any reason could later resume their place on the field at any time during the match.

Each team played each other twice in a home-and-away season of 14 rounds. Then, based on ladder positions after those 14 rounds, three further 'sectional rounds' were played, with the teams ranked 1st, 3rd, 5th and 7th playing in one section and the teams ranked 2nd, 4th, 6th and 8th playing in the other. 

Once the 17 round home-and-away season had finished, the 1907 VFL Premiers were determined by the specific format and conventions of the amended "Argus system".

Round 1

|- bgcolor="#CCCCFF"
| Home team
| Home team score
| Away team
| Away team score
| Venue
| Date
|- bgcolor="#FFFFFF"
| 
| 14.15 (99)
| 
| 9.2 (56)
| EMCG
| 27 April 1907
|- bgcolor="#FFFFFF"
| 
| 6.11 (47)
| 
| 5.9 (39)
| Victoria Park
| 27 April 1907
|- bgcolor="#FFFFFF"
| 
| 4.6 (30)
| 
| 8.8 (56)
| Princes Park
| 27 April 1907
|- bgcolor="#FFFFFF"
| 
| 6.5 (41)
| 
| 9.6 (60)
| Lake Oval
| 27 April 1907

Round 2

|- bgcolor="#CCCCFF"
| Home team
| Home team score
| Away team
| Away team score
| Venue
| Date
|- bgcolor="#FFFFFF"
| 
| 7.15 (57)
| 
| 7.5 (47)
| Brunswick Street Oval
| 4 May 1907
|- bgcolor="#FFFFFF"
| 
| 5.11 (41)
| 
| 6.12 (48)
| MCG
| 4 May 1907
|- bgcolor="#FFFFFF"
| 
| 8.14 (62)
| 
| 8.6 (54)
| Junction Oval
| 4 May 1907
|- bgcolor="#FFFFFF"
| 
| 3.9 (27)
| 
| 8.14 (62)
| Corio Oval
| 4 May 1907

Round 3

|- bgcolor="#CCCCFF"
| Home team
| Home team score
| Away team
| Away team score
| Venue
| Date
|- bgcolor="#FFFFFF"
| 
| 9.10 (64)
| 
| 12.5 (77)
| Brunswick Street Oval
| 11 May 1907
|- bgcolor="#FFFFFF"
| 
| 9.13 (67)
| 
| 5.7 (37)
| Junction Oval
| 11 May 1907
|- bgcolor="#FFFFFF"
| 
| 9.12 (66)
| 
| 5.8 (38)
| Lake Oval
| 11 May 1907
|- bgcolor="#FFFFFF"
| 
| 7.5 (47)
| 
| 12.14 (86)
| MCG
| 11 May 1907

Round 4

|- bgcolor="#CCCCFF"
| Home team
| Home team score
| Away team
| Away team score
| Venue
| Date
|- bgcolor="#FFFFFF"
| 
| 7.4 (46)
| 
| 11.16 (82)
| Corio Oval
| 18 May 1907
|- bgcolor="#FFFFFF"
| 
| 6.8 (44)
| 
| 6.11 (47)
| EMCG
| 18 May 1907
|- bgcolor="#FFFFFF"
| 
| 4.10 (34)
| 
| 6.10 (46)
| Victoria Park
| 18 May 1907
|- bgcolor="#FFFFFF"
| 
| 10.17 (77)
| 
| 3.7 (25)
| Princes Park
| 18 May 1907

Round 5

|- bgcolor="#CCCCFF"
| Home team
| Home team score
| Away team
| Away team score
| Venue
| Date
|- bgcolor="#FFFFFF"
| 
| 9.5 (59)
| 
| 7.9 (51)
| Corio Oval
| 25 May 1907
|- bgcolor="#FFFFFF"
| 
| 5.16 (46)
| 
| 9.7 (61)
| Princes Park
| 25 May 1907
|- bgcolor="#FFFFFF"
| 
| 13.9 (87)
| 
| 9.10 (64)
| Junction Oval
| 25 May 1907
|- bgcolor="#FFFFFF"
| 
| 5.8 (38)
| 
| 6.11 (47)
| EMCG
| 25 May 1907

Round 6

|- bgcolor="#CCCCFF"
| Home team
| Home team score
| Away team
| Away team score
| Venue
| Date
|- bgcolor="#FFFFFF"
| 
| 7.9 (51)
| 
| 15.18 (108)
| MCG
| 1 June 1907
|- bgcolor="#FFFFFF"
| 
| 4.6 (30)
| 
| 4.17 (41)
| Victoria Park
| 1 June 1907
|- bgcolor="#FFFFFF"
| 
| 6.9 (45)
| 
| 4.9 (33)
| Lake Oval
| 3 June 1907
|- bgcolor="#FFFFFF"
| 
| 10.7 (67)
| 
| 4.12 (36)
| Brunswick Street Oval
| 3 June 1907

Round 7

|- bgcolor="#CCCCFF"
| Home team
| Home team score
| Away team
| Away team score
| Venue
| Date
|- bgcolor="#FFFFFF"
| 
| 4.8 (32)
| 
| 7.2 (44)
| Junction Oval
| 15 June 1907
|- bgcolor="#FFFFFF"
| 
| 15.14 (104)
| 
| 7.8 (50)
| Princes Park
| 15 June 1907
|- bgcolor="#FFFFFF"
| 
| 8.7 (55)
| 
| 6.11 (47)
| MCG
| 15 June 1907
|- bgcolor="#FFFFFF"
| 
| 3.14 (32)
| 
| 5.8 (38)
| Corio Oval
| 15 June 1907

Round 8

|- bgcolor="#CCCCFF"
| Home team
| Home team score
| Away team
| Away team score
| Venue
| Date
|- bgcolor="#FFFFFF"
| 
| 7.10 (52)
| 
| 5.10 (40)
| MCG
| 22 June 1907
|- bgcolor="#FFFFFF"
| 
| 7.11 (53)
| 
| 3.10 (28)
| Corio Oval
| 22 June 1907
|- bgcolor="#FFFFFF"
| 
| 11.3 (69)
| 
| 11.12 (78)
| Brunswick Street Oval
| 22 June 1907
|- bgcolor="#FFFFFF"
| 
| 3.15 (33)
| 
| 8.14 (62)
| Junction Oval
| 22 June 1907

Round 9

|- bgcolor="#CCCCFF"
| Home team
| Home team score
| Away team
| Away team score
| Venue
| Date
|- bgcolor="#FFFFFF"
| 
| 5.13 (43)
| 
| 3.10 (28)
| EMCG
| 29 June 1907
|- bgcolor="#FFFFFF"
| 
| 9.13 (67)
| 
| 7.10 (52)
| Victoria Park
| 29 June 1907
|- bgcolor="#FFFFFF"
| 
| 5.9 (39)
| 
| 7.4 (46)
| Princes Park
| 29 June 1907
|- bgcolor="#FFFFFF"
| 
| 6.8 (44)
| 
| 7.10 (52)
| Lake Oval
| 29 June 1907

Round 10

|- bgcolor="#CCCCFF"
| Home team
| Home team score
| Away team
| Away team score
| Venue
| Date
|- bgcolor="#FFFFFF"
| 
| 5.7 (37)
| 
| 9.11 (65)
| EMCG
| 6 July 1907
|- bgcolor="#FFFFFF"
| 
| 8.9 (57)
| 
| 7.8 (50)
| Victoria Park
| 6 July 1907
|- bgcolor="#FFFFFF"
| 
| 9.16 (70)
| 
| 8.6 (54)
| Princes Park
| 6 July 1907
|- bgcolor="#FFFFFF"
| 
| 10.11 (71)
| 
| 4.8 (32)
| Corio Oval
| 6 July 1907

Round 11

|- bgcolor="#CCCCFF"
| Home team
| Home team score
| Away team
| Away team score
| Venue
| Date
|- bgcolor="#FFFFFF"
| 
| 6.18 (54)
| 
| 9.5 (59)
| Junction Oval
| 13 July 1907
|- bgcolor="#FFFFFF"
| 
| 8.11 (59)
| 
| 6.11 (47)
| Lake Oval
| 13 July 1907
|- bgcolor="#FFFFFF"
| 
| 2.10 (22)
| 
| 15.11 (101)
| MCG
| 13 July 1907
|- bgcolor="#FFFFFF"
| 
| 3.8 (26)
| 
| 15.14 (104)
| Brunswick Street Oval
| 13 July 1907

Round 12

|- bgcolor="#CCCCFF"
| Home team
| Home team score
| Away team
| Away team score
| Venue
| Date
|- bgcolor="#FFFFFF"
| 
| 3.7 (25)
| 
| 3.5 (23)
| Brunswick Street Oval
| 20 July 1907
|- bgcolor="#FFFFFF"
| 
| 10.10 (70)
| 
| 3.5 (23)
| Victoria Park
| 20 July 1907
|- bgcolor="#FFFFFF"
| 
| 6.13 (49)
| 
| 4.10 (34)
| MCG
| 20 July 1907
|- bgcolor="#FFFFFF"
| 
| 3.9 (27)
| 
| 4.12 (36)
| Lake Oval
| 20 July 1907

Round 13

|- bgcolor="#CCCCFF"
| Home team
| Home team score
| Away team
| Away team score
| Venue
| Date
|- bgcolor="#FFFFFF"
| 
| 6.6 (42)
| 
| 7.8 (50)
| Corio Oval
| 3 August 1907
|- bgcolor="#FFFFFF"
| 
| 8.10 (58)
| 
| 3.13 (31)
| EMCG
| 3 August 1907
|- bgcolor="#FFFFFF"
| 
| 5.15 (45)
| 
| 5.4 (34)
| Princes Park
| 3 August 1907
|- bgcolor="#FFFFFF"
| 
| 4.6 (30)
| 
| 7.5 (47)
| Junction Oval
| 3 August 1907

Round 14

|- bgcolor="#CCCCFF"
| Home team
| Home team score
| Away team
| Away team score
| Venue
| Date
|- bgcolor="#FFFFFF"
| 
| 5.9 (39)
| 
| 6.19 (55)
| Brunswick Street Oval
| 10 August 1907
|- bgcolor="#FFFFFF"
| 
| 15.6 (96)
| 
| 8.9 (57)
| Victoria Park
| 10 August 1907
|- bgcolor="#FFFFFF"
| 
| 8.16 (64)
| 
| 5.14 (44)
| Lake Oval
| 10 August 1907
|- bgcolor="#FFFFFF"
| 
| 3.7 (25)
| 
| 10.18 (78)
| EMCG
| 10 August 1907

Sectional Rounds

Sectional Round 1 (Round 15)

Sectional Round 2 (Round 16)

Sectional Round 3 (Round 17)

Ladder

Semi finals

First Semi Final

|- bgcolor="#CCCCFF"
| Home team
| Home team score
| Away team
| Away team score
| Venue
| Date
|  
|- bgcolor="#FFFFFF"
| 
| 12.10 (82)
| 
| 6.12 (48)
| MCG
| 07 September 1907
| Attendance: 28,856
|- bgcolor="#FFFFFF"

Second Semi Final

|- bgcolor="#CCCCFF"
| Home team
| Home team score
| Away team
| Away team score
| Venue
| Date
|  
|- bgcolor="#FFFFFF"
| 
| 13.13 (91)
| 
| 4.11 (35)
| MCG
| 14 September 1907
| Attendance: 25,531
|- bgcolor="#FFFFFF"

Grand final

Carlton defeated South Melbourne 6.14 (50) to 6.9 (45). (For an explanation of scoring see Australian rules football).

Awards
 The 1907 VFL Premiership team was Carlton.
 The VFL's leading goalkicker was Dick Lee of Collingwood with 47 goals.
 Essendon took the "wooden spoon" in 1907.

Notable events
The rules concerning kick-ins were amended, such that if the full back crossed outside the goal square before kicking the ball, a ball-up would be called on the top of the goal square. Previously, the full-back was given a second opportunity to kick legally, before a free kick would be awarded.
 Due to the "Special" football train arriving late, the start of the third match between Fitzroy and Geelong at Brunswick Street Oval was delayed by twenty minutes.
 In round 6, St Kilda defeated Melbourne 15.18 (108) to 7.9 (51); It was the first time in the club's 173 VFL matches to that point that St Kilda scored 100 points.
 The VFL played two representative matches on Saturday 8 June, in the week between Rounds 6 and 7: on the Melbourne Cricket Ground, the VFL 25.20 (170) defeated the Ballarat Football Association 3.7 (25); and at Bendigo, the VFL 14.10 (94) defeated the Bendigo Football League 7.11 (53). The VFL played a return match against the Ballarat Association on the Ballarat City Oval on Saturday 27 July, the week between Rounds 12 and 13; in a rain-affected game, the VFL 8.4 (52) defeated Ballarat 3.7 (25).
 In Round 8, Fitzroy kicked eleven goals without a behind against Collingwood, before three misses in the last quarter. They did not score in the second and third quarters after kicking 7.0 (42) in the first quarter.
 In Round 11, Geelong defeated St. Kilda despite having ten fewer scoring shots; before this, no VFL team had won with a deficit in scoring shots greater than eight. They repeated the feat of winning with ten fewer shots against Collingwood in the last round.
 During that last match, Collingwood succumbed to Geelong despite being 38 points ahead at three quarter time; this record was not beaten until 1936.
 The playing surface in each of the season's Semi-Finals that had been played on the Melbourne Cricket Ground (South Melbourne v. Collingwood, and Carlton v. St. Kilda) had been so rock hard and dusty that the two match winners demanded that the MCG be watered before the next Saturday, unless there was substantial rain. The VFL acquiesced to this request, and the ground was watered; the ensuing Premiership final, which Carlton won by 5 points, was on significantly softer ground.
 In the 1907 pre-season, then VFA team Richmond played a practice match against VFL team Geelong at Corio Oval, in direct defiance of a VFA edict. On 22 October 1907, Richmond, who had become quite dissatisfied with the VFA, applied to join the VFL; their application was unanimously accepted at a meeting nine days later, and Richmond competed for the first time in the 1908 VFL season.
 St Kilda qualify for their first VFL Finals appearance.

Footnotes

References
 Rogers, S. & Brown, A., Every Game Ever Played: VFL/AFL Results 1897–1997 (Sixth Edition), Viking Books, (Ringwood), 1998. 
 Ross, J. (ed), 100 Years of Australian Football 1897–1996: The Complete Story of the AFL, All the Big Stories, All the Great Pictures, All the Champions, Every AFL Season Reported, Viking, (Ringwood), 1996.

External links
 1907 Season - AFL Tables

Australian Football League seasons
VFL season